San Francisco Creek is a river in Texas. It is a tributary of the Rio Grande.

See also
 List of rivers of Texas
 List of tributaries of the Rio Grande

References

USGS Hydrologic Unit Map - State of Texas (1974)

Tributaries of the Rio Grande
Rivers of Texas